WJDI (1620 kHz AM) was a pirate radio station. It was located in Cottekill, New York from 1989 to 1996. It was one of the pioneering & most successful pirate stations, known as "The Pirate King". Despite being a pirate radio, the station was a member of the National Radio Club. This made a lasting impression on so many DXers across the world.

History
WJDI was run by Dave Schneider. It began its broadcast on January 1, 1970, on 1580 kHz using a Meissner Signal Shifter as its transmitter. The Meissner Signal Shifter used plug-in grid coils wound for amateur radio frequencies. Later on, the station began using Collins 30K transmitter rated for about 300 watts.  Since the transmitter only covered 3.5 mHz and higher, it a new set of plug-in coils with the aid of Schneider's Millen grid dip meter. In 1976, WJDI received a warning from the FCC for running a pirate station. In 1977, when Schneider moved to Arizona to work for Motorola Research on the Voyager II project, WJDI ceased its operations.

In Fall 1989, WJDI relaunched on 1620 kHz. This time, it used a home-made transmitter, which had an output power of 1,000 to 1,250 watts, & the final tube was a 4CX15000J and the modulators were 3000A7s driven with a FET modulation driver. A year later, its power increased to 2,500 watts. WJDI featured current music of the era with clever parody commercials between songs such as the famous dioxin “No Roach!” ad. In January 1991, WJDI was raided once again by the FCC, and was fined. As a result, WJDI went off the air for the next few years.

Schneider built a home-made 15 kW transmitter from scratch for 6 months. It was equipped with a Harris RF-1310 exciter, Harris RF-590 receiver, 4-1000a tube and 810s modulators. It turned out to be an actual AM broadcast band transmitter (not a 160-meter amateur rig). Its 300 ft. antenna had a horizontal 5-wire cage design, had the required 400 amp electrical service, and its design was directional with nulls produced in certain directions. Reception reports came in from all over the country and beyond. Only 2 official broadcasts were made: December 25 & December 31, 1996. From that point, WJDI was never heard on air again.

External links
WJDI 1620 Audio Archive
1620 Pirate
Pirates at the top of the dial
The WJDI Story

JDI
Pirate radio stations in the United States
Defunct radio stations in the United States
Radio stations established in 1970
Radio stations disestablished in 1976
Radio stations established in 1989
Radio stations disestablished in 1991
Radio stations disestablished in 1996
1970 establishments in New York (state)
1976 disestablishments in New York (state)
1989 establishments in New York (state)
1996 disestablishments in New York (state)
1991 disestablishments in New York (state)
JDI